BattleTech: Map Set 1 is a game supplement for BattleTech published by FASA in 1985.

Contents
BattleTech: Map Set 1 is a pack of four maps on cardstock which contained maps identified as: "Open Terrain", "River Valley", "Lake Area" and "City/Industrial Complex".

Reviews
White Wolf #7 (1987)

References

BattleTech supplements